Shabiluy or Sheybluy, also rendered as Shabilu or Sheyblu or Shebilu, may refer to:
 Shabiluy-e Olya (disambiguation)
 Shabiluy-e Sofla (disambiguation)